USS Burges may refer to the following ships operated by the United States Navy:

 , was laid down on 8 December 1942. Renamed Edgar G. Chase (DE-16) and launched on 26 January 1943. Transferred to the Royal Navy under the terms of the lend-lease agreement on 2 June 1943; and commissioned in the Royal Navy that same day.
 , laid down on 14 March 1942 and launched on 26 September 1942. She was renamed Edgar G. Chase (DE-16) on 19 February 1943.

References
 

United States Navy ship names